The Delaware River Basin Commission (DRBC) is a United States government agency created in 1961 by an interstate compact, signed into law by President John F. Kennedy, between four states (Pennsylvania, Delaware, New Jersey, and New York).

Purpose and activities

The purpose of the Commission is to bring the Delaware River under collective and balanced control, and to ensure fair usage by the states.  To this end, the Commission conducts programs related to water quality protection, water supply allocation and water conservation, regulatory review and permitting, watershed planning, drought management, flood mitigation and loss reduction, and recreational activities (such as fishing).

The DRBC was one of the first government agencies in the United States to address the problem of water pollution.  The agency predates the establishment of the United States Environmental Protection Agency (1970) and the Clean Water Act (1972).

Membership
The five members of the Commission include the four state governors of the member states and the Division Engineer, North Atlantic Division, U.S. Army Corps of Engineers, who serves as the ex-officio U.S. member. As of 2021 the Commission Chair is Delaware Governor John Carney and the Federal Representative is Brigadier General Thomas J. Tickner.

See also

 Partnership for the Delaware Estuary - Regional nonprofit organization

References

External links
Official site
Delaware River Basin Commission in the Federal Register
Brief history of the Commission from the Delaware State Archives

United States interstate agencies
Delaware River
Government agencies established in 1961
Water management authorities in the United States
Water law in the United States
Delaware law
New York (state) law
New Jersey law
Pennsylvania law